The Indigenous All-Stars (known as for sponsorship reasons Qantas Kickstart Indigenous All-Stars and formerly known as the Aboriginal All-Stars) is an Australian rules football team composed of players that identify as Indigenous Australian or with an indigenous culture.

The team has also represented Australia (in 2013) in the International Rules Series. The junior (U18 and U16) side is known as the Flying Boomerangs.

The team was originally based on Canberra, Australian Capital Territory, but have been based in Darwin, Northern Territory since 1993. The AFL promotes the concept as recognition of the indigenous Australians' contribution to the national competition, with approximately one in ten AFL players identifying as an Indigenous Australian. Since 2003, the team played a regular biennial pre-season match against an Australian Football League (AFL) club; the only exception was in 2011, when the scheduled match was cancelled due to inclement weather. The matches were usually played in the Northern Territory, either at Marrara Oval in Darwin or Traeger Park in Alice Springs. 

In recent years, the AFL's support for the concept has waned and the league has been criticised for letting its clubs prevent the All-Stars from selecting its top Indigenous senior players, or for placing restrictions on their game time. Additionally, the competing club side often treats the match as a preseason practice match, such that winning the match is less important than developing young players or building match fitness prior to the regular season. Despite this, the match remains popular with spectators in the Northern Territory. The 2003 match retains the record for the most attended match of any football code in the Northern Territory, with 17,500 in attendance.

The best on ground for the Indigenous All-Stars is awarded the Polly Farmer Medal which is in honour of Graham Farmer.

In 2018, the AFL created an All-Indigenous "All-Star" AFLX 8 player team named "Deadly" captained by Indigenous All-Star Eddie Betts. This team played in the 2019 AFLX tournament winning 1 of its 3 matches. However the AFLX format was widely criticised  as an unsuitable replacement for Australian rules matches and was soon abandoned.

History

All-indigenous sides have been documented as early the turn of the 20th Century and the first representative teams began playing matches after World War II.

Following his career in the VFA Doug Nicholls was instrumental in the concept of an All-Aboriginal representative side. He organised (assembling players mainly from Taree in New South Wales), captained and coached an All-Aboriginal side against the VFA's Northcote Football Club in 1944. Among the aboriginal players was James Murray, Australian Kangaroos rugby league representative. The match drew more than 10,000 spectators.

Nicolls team's matches against the Northcote Football Club became an annual event becoming a regular fixture in 1945 and 1946. The match led to a number of similar contests springing up around the country. It played a charity match against VFA club Oakleigh Football Club attracting 2,000 spectators.

One of the first major representative matches was a side's defeat the Australian Capital Territory, one of the strongest sides in the country, at Manuka Oval in Canberra in 1970.

In 1973, a team was assembled from the best indigenous Australians across all states and territories to tour Papua New Guinea and play against the Papua New Guinea team. It was originally also scheduled to play against Nauru's national team. Sir Douglas Nicholls accompanied the side. The Australian side lost narrowly and a return match in Australia was scheduled for an Aboriginal Australian Rules carnival to be hosted by the Australian Capital Territory Papua New Guinea narrowly defeated the Indigenous Australian side at Ainslie Oval.

All-Stars take on the VFL
In 1983 the "All-Stars" competed in a once-off post-season exhibition match in Mildura, two games were played in 1985 and another once-off game was played in 1994. 

A match between the All-Stars and The Swans was proposed for Canberra in 1984, to be organised by the National Football League but did not go ahead.

All-Stars take on National competition
The 1993 a bi-annual All-Stars vs Collingwood match was proposed.

In 1994 disputes over player releases put the concept into doubt. The St Kilda Football Club refused to release Nicky Winmar and the West Coast Eagles refused to release Chris Lewis to play.

As of 2015, the All-Stars have won six of the ten matches it has played. The record attendance for the match was 17,500, in the 2003 match against Carlton at Marrara Oval.

Uncertain future
The AFL in 2017 committed to holding a match featuring the All-Stars, however reduced its commitment to every four years.

In 2018, the AFL created an All-Indigenous "All-Star" AFLX 8 player team named "Deadly" captained by Indigenous All-Star Eddie Betts. This team played in the 2019 AFLX tournament winning 1 of its 3 matches. However the AFLX format was widely criticised  as an unsuitable replacement for Australian rules matches and was soon abandoned.

Postponing a proposed 2019 match, the AFL Players' Association's Indigenous members which manage the team decided in 2017 that the match should be scheduled for every 4 years instead of 2.

Sponsorship and naming rights
Until 2005 the All-Stars were sponsored by the Aboriginal and Torres Strait Islander Commission, who had naming rights over the team.  After the abolition of ATSIC, the team was renamed from Aboriginal All-Stars to Indigenous All-Stars.  Since 2006 the team has been sponsored by Qantas through the AFL Kickstart indigenous program.

Results

Squads

1973 team
Riger Rigney (SA); Michael Mansell (Tas); Anthony Miller (WA); Brian Warrior (SA); Dennis Lewfat (NT); Patrick Purantatameri (NT); Reg Mathews (QLD); Bill Ellis (NT); John McHenry (WA); Leon Wanganeen (SA); Alec Smith (Vic); John Pepperill (NT); Phillip Archer (SA); Ian Charles (VIC); Robbie Muir (VIC); Ken Liddle (NT); Wilfred Wilson (SA); Tim Agius (SA); Garry Murray (VIC); Paul Hansen (WA); Lloyd Bray (NT)

International Rules
The Indigenous All Stars have also competed in the annual International Rules Series, representing Australia in the hybrid sport which consists elements of Gaelic football and Australian rules football. For the 2013 Series a 33-man squad was chosen, which was reduced to 21-man touring party:

The Indigenous team lost the series 2-0 and by a record 173–72 aggregate point margin.

Polly Farmer Medal

The Polly Farmer Medal is awarded each game to the best Indigenous All-Stars player.

See also

 Flying Boomerangs
 Rugby league Indigenous All Stars

References

 
Indigenous Australian sport
Organisations serving Indigenous Australians